Vashnam-e Kheyr Mohammad (also Romanized as Vashnām-e Kheyr Moḩammad; also known as Kheyrmoḩammad) is a village in Kambel-e Soleyman Rural District, in the Central District of Chabahar County, Sistan and Baluchestan Province, Iran. At the 2006 census, its population was 96, in 13 families.

References 

Populated places in Chabahar County